Jean-Christophe De Clercq  (born in 1966 in Issy-les-Moulineaux) is a French artist who lives and works in Champeix, Auvergne.

Painting 

"To produce the maximum of effects with a minimum of means", such is the definition of the painting of Jean-Christophe De Clercq according to the art critic Jacques Henric.

Solo exhibitions 

1988 : Centre culturel Das Haus, Rorschach, Switzerland
1990 : Galerie Windeg, Herisau, Switzerland
2001 : Galerie Garde à vue, Clermont-Ferrand, France
2001 : Galerie Lazertis, Zurich, Switzerland
2005 : Galerie 14, Paris, France
2005 : Galerie Arkos, Clermont-Ferrand, France
2006 : Galerie Africana, Zurich, Switzerland
2006 : Galerie Lazertis, Zurich, Switzerland
2007 : Galerie Arkos, Clermont-Ferrand, France
2008 : Établissement thermal du Mont-Dore - Route des villes d'eaux du massif central, France
2009 : Paul Smith, Paris, France
2011 : Salles Jean-Hélion, Centre culturel Nicolas-Pomel, Issoire, France
2014 : Galerie Arigang. Maison de la Corée, Clermont-Ferrand.
2015 : Lycée René-Descartes, Cournon.
2016 : Galerie Louis Gendre, Chamalières.
2018 : Domaine Royal de Randan, FRAC Auvergne.
2020-21 : Exposition “Les figures numériques de Jean‐Christophe De Clercq”, Galerie Louis Gendre, Chamalières.

Collective exhibitions

2002 : FRAC Auvergne, Territoires inoccupés. Clermont-Ferrand.
2003 : Les mars de l’art contemporain, Saint-Saturnin.
2003 : Galerie Garde à Vue, Autour d’un rouge. Clermont-Ferrand.
2004 : Graphes et Partition, site expérimental des pratiques artistiques, Rennes. Avec la collaboration du FRAC (Bretagne)
2006 : Galerie 14, Paris.
2006 : Galerie Arkos, Tous ensemble. Clermont-Ferrand
2008 : Galerie L.J. Beaubourg, Paris.
2012 : Verein Für Originalgraphik, Zurich.
2012 : Sangallensia IV- Christian Roellin Gallery, St. Gallen
2013 : FRAC Auvergne (2 février- 12 mai). Clermont-Fd.
2015 : Recto Verso. Fondation Louis Vuitton.
2015 : Les Tours de lumière, Saint-Saturnin.
2015 : Sangallensia VI- Christian Roellin Gallery, Saint-Gall.
2015 : Un dessein de dessins. FRAC Auvergne.
2016 : A quoi tient la beauté des étreintes, FRAC Auvergne.
2017 : Matières d'Art, Jardins du château d'Hauterive.

Public collections 

FRAC Auvergne
Direction de la culture, Canton de Saint-Gall, Suisse.

References 

 Artpress n°341. p. 90. Frédéric Bouglé. January 2008.
 La Belle Revue rétrospective 2011. January 2012.
 Vincent Victor Jouffe. Jean-Christophe de Clercq: travaux sur papier, photographie, vidéo, 1986-2011. Edition Mairie d'Issoire, 37 p. 2011.

Notes

External links 
 Jean-Christophe De Clercq's site 
 FRAC Auvergne's site 
 Le Delarge: Dictionnaire des arts plastiques et contemporains 

1966 births
People from Issy-les-Moulineaux
20th-century French painters
20th-century French male artists
French male painters
21st-century French painters
21st-century French male artists
Living people
French abstract artists
Modern painters
Minimalist artists
French contemporary artists